Julien Morice (born 20 July 1991) is a French former professional racing cyclist, who competed as a professional from 2015 to 2022.

He rode at the 2015 UCI Track Cycling World Championships, where he took a bronze medal in the individual pursuit. He was named in the startlist for the 2016 Vuelta a España.

Major results

2014
 7th Overall Paris–Arras Tour
2018
 1st Stage 1 (ITT) Sharjah Tour

Grand Tour general classification results timeline

References

External links
 

1991 births
Living people
French male cyclists
French track cyclists
Sportspeople from Vannes
Cyclists from Brittany